Hayden Creek is a river in Otsego County, in the U.S. State of New York. It begins north-northwest of the Hamlet of East Springfield and flows generally southward before flowing into Otsego Lake south of the Hamlet of Springfield Center.

Course
Hayden Creek begins northeast of the Hamlet of Springfield Center and flows southwest before flowing into Summit Lake. It then exits the lake and flows southward, crossing under U.S. Route 20, and then flows into Shipman Pond.

Fishing
Suckers can be speared and taken in the section of the creek from the mouth to the Shipman Pond dam from January 1 to May 15, each year.

References

Rivers of Otsego County, New York
Rivers of New York (state)